Moma (also Kulawi) is an Austronesian language spoken in Central Sulawesi, Indonesia. Historically, it is derived from the Kaili dialect cluster, but is divergent due to strong influence from Uma.

Phonology
The sound inventory of Moma below had been described by Adriani and Esser (1939).

Like many other languages on Sulawesi, Moma has only open syllables.

Grammar
Moma has the following pronoun sets:

References

Further reading

 
 

Kaili–Pamona languages
Languages of Sulawesi